The United States House of Representatives elections in California, 1880 was an election for California's delegation to the United States House of Representatives, which occurred as part of the general election of the House of Representatives on November 2, 1880. Democrats gained one district.

Overview

Delegation Composition

Results
Final results from the Clerk of the House of Representatives:

District 1

District 2

District 3

District 4

See also
47th United States Congress
Political party strength in California
Political party strength in U.S. states
United States House of Representatives elections, 1880

References
California Elections Page
Office of the Clerk of the House of Representatives

External links
California Legislative District Maps (1911-Present)
RAND California Election Returns: District Definitions

1880
United States House of Representatives
California